The 1928 Texas Mines Miners football team was an American football team that represented Texas School of Mines (now known as the University of Texas at El Paso) as an independent during the 1928 college football season.  In its second season under head coach E. J. Stewart, the team compiled a 3–4–1 record and was outscored by a total of 103 to 100. The team won its annual rivalry game with New Mexico A&M by a 6-0 score.

Schedule

References

Texas Mines
UTEP Miners football seasons
Texas Mines Miners football